Thomas II may refer to:

Thomas II of Acerra (d. 1273),  Count of Acerra from 1251 to his death
Thomas II, Archbishop of Esztergom (d. 1321)
Thomas II of Piedmont (c. 1199 – 1259),  Count of Piedmont from 1233 to his death
Thomas II Preljubović,  ruler of Epirus in Ioannina from 1366 to 1384
Thomas II of York  (d. 24 February 1114), a medieval archbishop of York 
Thomas II of Saluzzo  (d. 1357) 
Thomas II of Constantinople, Ecumenical Patriarch of Constantinople from 667 to 669
Thomas II, Bishop of Nocera, bishop from Acerno who served in Apulia in the 14th century
Thomas II Zaremba, a medieval bishop of Wrocław